Fireman Sam: The Great Fire of Pontypandy is a 2009 computer-animated film, based on the CGI series Fireman Sam. Directed by Jerry Hibbert, produced by Margo Merchant and written by Dave Ingham, it stars the voice cast of Steve Kynman, David Carling, Su Douglas and Tegwen Tucker. The film introduced a new character Chief Fire Officer Boyce, a Chief Officer who hails from Newtown, and a new location the Lighthouse. In the film, Norman, Derek, Sarah, James and Dilys go pioneering with Trevor Evans in the forest. Norman and Derek attempt to light a campfire to cook sausages by rubbing sticks together. They are called away, not realising that the fire has caught, and this leads to the "Great Fire of Pontypandy" that the townspeople evacuated Pontypanty. It was released on 9 November 2009 by HIT Entertainment.

Plot
In a stormy night, Charlie Jones is working in the lighthouse. But the wind causes him and the lighthouse door to blow over, leaving Charlie clinging onto the railings of the Lighthouse. Eventually, Fireman Sam and Elvis Cridlington save him and manage to replace the broken lighthouse light as well. One month later, Sam is given an award by Chief Fire Officer Boyce, who offers him a promotion to head the rapid response service in Newtown. Sam promises to think about it until the end of the day, which is soon interrupted by a call informing them that Mike Flood has fallen off the boathouse roof and into the sea. As Sam is passing by Trevor Evans in his bus, he tells Sam that Trevor is going to Pontypandy Pioneers camping in the forest, who warns that the campfires are not allowed due to very hot and too dry forest. Meanwhile, Dilys Price has invited Derek on a camping trip with the other Pontypandy Pioneers. As they leave, Norman sneaks some sausages into his bag, who refused to eat bugs and berries.

At the Flood's house, Helen and Mandy are having trouble getting their car to work due to Mike's other works, with the former suggesting they go and find the Pioneers on foot instead, as they were all planning to spend family time together. Back on the camping trip, Trevor sets up a mantrap to trap something, but after not finding anything, he leaves it without deactivating the trap. As Helen and Mandy are trying to find the campsite, Helen steps into the mantrap that Trevor set up minutes earlier. Sam and Penny Morris leave the station, but as Elvis and Radar are already there, Helen is rescued. Back at the Fire Station, Boyce tells Elvis how brave Station Officer Steele was fighting a fire, and this gets Elvis thinking on how to be a true hero like everyone else has been. Steele himself is informed by Sam about the Pioneers Camping Trip, and that the hot weather could set a small spark of fire into a massive flame in seconds. Sam and Elvis set up signs to warn about it, while Trevor and the Pioneers get along ahead with their walk. Upon finishing setting up the Fire signs, Elvis soon discovers that Sam may leave Pontypandy to take in the promotion at Newtown. After sneaking off, Norman and Derek cooks the sausages in the campfire, ignoring all the fire warnings and sets fire to old wood using a sharp wood pin. Dilys finds them but fails to notice the fire, which soon expands.

Meanwhile, at the lighthouse, Mike forgot his phone and the hammer and soon locks himself in the lighthouse after he mends the door. He soon sees smoke coming from the forest and as his mobile is locked out, he uses the lighthouse to spell "FOREST FIRE" in Morse Code, but actually spells "FOREST FIRT". Sam and Penny read the code and call Steele to the forest. The campsite group smell the smoke and leave the campsite to get out of the forest. The fire spreads to the campsite. Elvis and Radar find the group and follow Venus' siren, getting out of the forest before the fire engulfs it. Tom attempts to dampen the forest down in his helicopter but has no effect so Station Officer Steele warns everyone that if they cannot contain it they will have to evacuate the town.

Norman suggests that they should call other fire engines from Newtown but Steele tells him that they would be too far away to get there in time. By this point, the fire has completely cut the group off. Sam suggests that everyone can help by flattening the grass at the edge of the forest and keeping the heat down with the hoses. The fire reaches the edge of the forest and the four firefighters attack it, to little effect. A falling branch nearly hits Sam but Elvis comes to the rescue, diving and pushing Sam out of the way. The fire is soon proven to be too much for the firefighters to handle, and soon Steele then tells everyone to retreat to collect Boyce and go straight to the harbour as the fire is unbeatable and leave Pontypandy to be buried underneath the waves of fire. They take one last look at the fire station and set off. The vehicles drive to the harbour as Sam looks at the stormy clouds, pleading them to come towards the fire. As everyone gets all aboard Charlie's boat, the rain pours down and puts out the fire to everyone's delight.

As Norman and Derek celebrate not moving out of Pontypandy, the former's backpack flies up high, opens up and Radar soon reveals the sausages the two tried to cook earlier. Everyone is surprised, with Steele scolds Norman for setting the forest on fire, and Dilys says that she will make sure Norman is properly dealt with. Boyce is impressed with Sam, and the latter rejects his Newtown Fire Station offer, and decides to stay in Pontypandy because he sees the town needs him. A month following the Great Fire of Pondypandy, Steele and Boyce reward Elvis for saving Sam and for his outstanding bravery. Trevor also rewards Mandy, Sarah and James with Survivor Medals, while Norman and Derek get nothing at all, blaming each other for wanting sausages. Mike also apologizes to Mandy and Helen for not spending time with each other and agree to do so. The townsfolk holding a huge party to celebrate, and follows on with the music video "He's Our Friend".

Cast

Reception

Fireman Sam: The Great Fire of Pontypandy was given a critical analysis on the website Raising Children Network. The film was rated G, and was advised for children aged 5 and up. The genre was "children's animated adventure", its length was 63 minutes and the release date was 28 October 2010. It commented on the prevalent themes, namely "the threat of fire; accidents and rescues". The review mentioned that some scenes could potentially scare or disturb children under 5, such as when "Mike falls off the roof of a house into the harbour, and struggles to stay afloat". The review concluded with some discussion points for parents with their children: "The main messages from this movie are about helping people in need and pulling together as a community. The movie also looks at the bad things that happen when you do the wrong thing. Values in this movie that you could reinforce with your children include selflessness, and care and concern for others. This movie could also give you the chance to talk with your children about real-life issues such as stealing, lighting fires, and ignoring safety instructions."

References

External links
 

2009 television films
2009 films
British children's films
British computer-animated films
British television films
Films set in Wales
Mattel Creations films
2000s children's films
Fireman Sam
2000s English-language films
Films about firefighting
2000s British films